PWT may refer to:

Pacific Western Transportation
Palau Time
Penn World Table
Personal Wireless Telecommunications
Plain White T's, American pop rock band
Poisson Wavelet Transform
Poor White Trash
Press Women of Texas
Pro Wrestling Tees
Rogožarski PVT
Bremerton National Airport in Bremerton, Washington, USA
Pennyweight
Pokémon World Tournament, a battle facility in Pokémon Black 2 and White 2